Luther Banks St Charles Obi (born 29 April 1993) is a Nigerian-born South African professional rugby union player for the  in the Currie Cup and the Rugby Challenge. His regular position is as a winger.

Luther has attained his LLB Law degree from The University of South Africa (UNISA); making him one of few professional rugby players with a higher qualification.

Career

Youth and Varsity rugby

He played for them at the 2006 Under-13 Craven Week competition and for their Under-16 side at the 2009 Grant Khomo Week.

He finished as the third-highest try scorer in that competition, scoring ten tries.

Leopards

Obi's first class debut came in the 2013 Currie Cup First Division competition. He started each of the remaining matches of the season, making 14 appearances in total.

Obi was subsequently included in the  wider training group prior to the 2014 Super Rugby season.

Eastern Province Kings

An agreement was reached and Obi officially joined the Kings on 27 February.

Bulls

After just one season at the Kings, Obi joined the Pretoria-based  side for the 2016 Super Rugby season.

Cheetahs

Representative rugby

In 2013, he was included in the South Africa Under-20 side that competed at the 2013 IRB Junior World Championship. He scored four tries in his five appearances and finished joint-second in the try-scoring charts behind compatriot Seabelo Senatla, helping the S.A. Under-20 side to third place in the competition.

References

Nigerian rugby union players
South African rugby union players
Living people
1993 births
People from Aba, Abia
Leopards (rugby union) players
Rugby union wings
South Africa Under-20 international rugby union players
Eastern Province Elephants players
Blue Bulls players
Free State Cheetahs players
Cheetahs (rugby union) players
Pumas (Currie Cup) players
Griquas (rugby union) players